Menz is a province or district of Ethiopia.

Menz may also refer to:

People

Surname
 Abraham Joseph Menz, an eighteenth century rabbi and mathematician
 Christoph Menz (b. 1988), a German footballer
 Karl-Heinz Menz (born 1949), German biathlete
 Katharina Menz (born 1990), a German judoka
 Sacha Menz (born 1963), a Swiss architect
 William Menz (1849–1898) founder of W. Menz & Co., South Australian biscuit and confectionery makers (now Robern Menz)

Given name
 Menz Lindsey (1897–1961), a professional American football player and lawyer

Surnames from given names